The 2013 AMJ Campbell Shorty Jenkins Classic was held from September 19 to 22 at the Brockville Country Club in Brockville, Ontario as part of the 2013–14 World Curling Tour. Both the men's and women's events was held in a round robin format. The purse for the men's event was CAD$45,400, while the purse for the women's event was CAD$18,000.

In the men's final, Brad Jacobs of Northern Ontario defeated Jeff Stoughton of Manitoba with a score of 7–5 after stealing a point in the last end of an otherwise tight game. In the women's final, Mirjam Ott of Switzerland defeated Ontario's Rachel Homan with a score of 8–5 in seven ends.

Men

Teams
The teams are listed as follows:

Round Robin Standings
Final Round Robin Standings

Playoffs

Women

Teams
The teams are listed as follows:

Round Robin Standings
Final Round Robin Standings

Playoffs

References

External links

AMJ Campbell Shorty Jenkins Classic, 2013
2013
Sport in Brockville